Pangogo is a village in the Yaba Department of Nayala Province in north-western Burkina Faso. The village has a population of 1,187.

References

Populated places in the Boucle du Mouhoun Region
Nayala Province